Levan Akin (born 14 December 1979) is a Swedish film director and screenwriter, best known for his film And Then We Danced, that received critical acclaim and won the 2019 Guldbagge Award for Best Film.

Biography 
Levan Akin was born and raised in Tumba, Sweden. His parents, of Georgian origin, had moved to Sweden in the 1960s, when Georgia was one of the republics of the Soviet Union. Levan Akin returns to Georgia every year with his sister for the summer holidays. There he consolidates his knowledge of Georgian culture and the practice of the Georgian language.

Career 
Levan Akin started out as an assistant director in film productions, mainly at Sveriges Television. He worked at Studio 24 for the production of You, the Living (Du Levande) by Roy Andersson (2007).

In 2008, he won two awards at the Hamburg Film Festival alongside film designer and producer Erika Stark for the short film De sista sakerna (2008). Levan Akin then directed series such as Second Avenue (Andra Avenyn, 2008–2010), Livet i Fagervik (2009), Anno 1790 (2011) and Real Humans (Äkta människor, 2012) for the television channel Sveriges Television.

In autumn 2011, his first feature film Katinkas kalas, premiered at the Stockholm International Film Festival. The scenario was based on the inner tensions of a group of young people celebrating a birthday on a summer night. Three of the cast, mostly not known to the wider public, received nominations for the L'Oréal Paris Rising Star award, and Yohanna Idha was nominated for 2013 Guldbagge Award as Best Supporting Actress.

In 2019, Levan Akin's second film And Then We Danced was released to critical acclaim. It was premiered in the Directors' Fortnight section at the 2019 Cannes Film Festival where it received a fifteen-minute standing ovation.  Set in Georgia, the film follows Merab, a student from a Georgian traditional dance school who falls in love with his male rival. The Georgian Orthodox Church officially expressed its disapproval of the promotion and screening of the film, and the release of the film in November 2019 caused riots in Tbilisi and Batumi.

In June 2020, Levan Akin was selected as a member of the Academy of Motion Picture Arts and Sciences.

Filmography

Director

Feature films 
 2011: Katinkas kalas
 2015: The Circle
 2019: And Then We Danced Short film 
 2008: De sista sakerna TV shows 
 2007: Labyrint mobisodes 2008–2010: Second Avenue (Andra Avenyn) (10 episodes)
 2009: Livet i Fagervik (3 episodes)
 2011: Anno 1790 (3 episodes)
 2012: Real Humans (Äkta människor'') (20 episodes)
 2022: Interview with the Vampire (2 episodes)

References

External links 

1979 births
Living people
Swedish film directors
Swedish screenwriters
Swedish television directors
Swedish television writers
Best Screenplay Guldbagge Award winners
People from Tumba, Sweden
Swedish people of Georgian descent